Rui Pedro Viegas Silva Gomes Duarte (born 16 September 1978) is a Portuguese former professional footballer who played as a central midfielder, currently a manager.

He amassed Primeira Liga totals of 162 matches and 12 goals over ten seasons, representing Belenenses, Estrela da Amadora and Olhanense in the competition. He added 164 games and 26 goals in the Segunda Liga, for four clubs.

In 2017, Duarte began working as a coach.

Playing career
Born in Lisbon, Duarte joined the youth ranks of local C.F. Os Belenenses as an 11-year-old, making his Primeira Liga debut for the club in the 1999–2000 season (seven matches, one goal). He took his game to the Segunda Liga in 2003, representing in quick succession Associação Naval 1º de Maio and Leixões SC.

After signing in the summer of 2006 from C.F. Estrela da Amadora, Duarte went on to spend the better part of his 19-year senior career with S.C. Olhanense, winning the 2008–09 Liga de Honra and remaining with the team in the top division for the following five seasons, with him as captain. He rescinded his contract in November 2014, and moved to their Algarve rivals S.C. Farense for the new year.

Coaching career
After retiring in 2015 at the age of 37, Duarte worked as an assistant to Lázaro Oliveira at Farense, and took the helm on the latter's dismissal on 2 April 2017. In his first full season in charge of the side from Faro he won promotion from the third division with a penalty shootout victory against U.D. Vilafranquense in the semi-finals, but lost the championship game 2–1 to C.D. Mafra on 10 June 2018.

On 4 February 2019, Duarte resigned from Farense, who were tenth in second tier after a five-game winless run that left them that many points outside the relegation zone. He returned to the same league on 4 October at second-from-bottom Casa Pia A.C. after the sacking of Luís Loureiro but, on 17 December, he quit having won once in nine fixtures and the team's ranking unaltered.

References

External links

1978 births
Living people
Portuguese footballers
Footballers from Lisbon
Association football midfielders
Primeira Liga players
Liga Portugal 2 players
Segunda Divisão players
S.C. Olhanense players
S.C. Dragões Sandinenses players
C.F. Os Belenenses players
Associação Naval 1º de Maio players
Leixões S.C. players
C.F. Estrela da Amadora players
S.C. Farense players
Portuguese football managers
Liga Portugal 2 managers
S.C. Farense managers
C.D. Trofense managers